The Type 81 (literally; "Type 81 Automatic Rifle") is a Chinese-designed second-generation, selective-fire, gas-operated 7.62×39mm assault rifle based on Kalashnikov and SKS actions adopted by the People's Liberation Army (PLA) and has been in service since the mid-1980s. It is a small arms family that consist of the Type 81, the Type 81-1 and the Type 81 LMG.

History
The PLA's first attempt to replace their aging SKS and Type 56 assault rifle (a Chinese license produced AK-47) was the Type 63 assault rifle. This weapon, however, ended in failure due to a variety of issues resulting in a switch back to the weapons it intended to replace. The beginning of the Sino-Vietnamese border conflicts showed the PLA that their SKS and Type 56s were not as effective as they thought, causing their small arms development program to spring back to life.

The weapon was introduced into PLA service in 1981 but did not become widely distributed until the late 1980s. It replaced the SKS, the Type 56 and the RPD, succeeding where the Type 63 failed. Its first combat use came during the latter part of the Sino-Vietnamese border conflicts of the mid-1980s. The PLA has replaced most of its Type 81s with the Type 95 or Type 03 series of weapons, though it is still in service in the reserves and armed police.

An improved version is used by the Bangladesh Army under the designation BD-08.

Design
The Type 81 incorporates elements of the Dragunov, SKS, and AK series of rifles. The design criteria it met included accuracy of 1.78 inch R50, 50% of the hits within a 1.78 inch diameter at 100 meters; improved controllability in full-automatic; the same reliability of the AK but a longer service life to approximately 20,000 rounds; and the ability to use AK and SKS production tooling at the time. Development was placed under Wang Zi Jun after the end of the Sino-Vietnamese border clashes in 1979.

The rifle retains the general layout of the Chinese Type 56, but it has an SKS-like short-stroke gas-piston design and other improvements to reduce recoil and muzzle jump, giving better firing accuracy. Notable physical differences from the Type 56 include the stock of the rifle, the length of the action, bayonet, and the positioning of the front sight. The most easily distinguishable feature of the Type 81 is the more exposed muzzle part of the barrel. The front sight has been moved back as a modification to be able to fire 22mm rifle grenades, which are slid over the unobstructed barrel muzzle now formed into a spigot-type rifle grenade launcher.

There is a significant gap between the trigger guard and the magazine on Type 81 rifles, while on the Type 56 rifle series the magazine is adjacent to the front of the trigger guard.

The non-detachable swing-out spike-shaped bayonet of the Type 56 rifle was also replaced on Type 81 rifles with the detachable Type 81 knife-bayonet.

Like its predecessors, the Type 81 is a series of weapons. The Type 81 (fixed stock) and Type 81-1 (folding stock) are 7.62×39mm caliber assault rifles with 30-round magazines, and the heavier Type 81 light machine gun (LMG) fitted with a 75-round drum magazine is used in the squad automatic weapon (SAW) role. Its sight remains at the front of the LMG barrel.

The Type 81 can be fitted with a Picatinny rail, bipod, foregrip, and flashlight. One such attempt to market Picatinny rails for the Type 81 came from Bao Wa, a Hong Kong-based law enforcement supplier.

Variants

 Type 81: 7.62×39mm rifle with a fixed wooden buttstock. 400,000 were produced before it was replaced by the Type 81-1.
 Type 81-1: 7.62×39mm rifle with a foldable buttstock. Originally intended for paratrooper use, the Type 81-1 replaced the Type 81 with its fixed wooden buttstock as the standard issue rifle for the PLA.
 Type 81 LMG: 7.62×39mm squad machine gun
 Type 81 MGS or [Type 81SA "LMG version"]: Semi-automatic only version of the Type 81 LMG. Also known as the Type 81SA "LMG version" in Canada.
 Type 81S: Early semi-automatic only model intended for the (civilian) U.S. market. Only 20 were imported in January 1989 before further importation was blocked by executive order.
 EM356: 5.56×45mm variant of the Type 81S, intended for the (civilian) U.S. market. Only 3 Tool room prototypes were completed and imported for the 1989 SHOT show before importation was banned along with the Type 81S by executive order. No magazines were ever made for them so modified 5.56×45mm AK magazines must be used instead.
 T81SA: Semi-automatic variant in 7.62×39mm. for sale in Canada by Tactical Imports
 T81-1SA: Same as above, but with folding buttstock.
 Type 87: Served as a development platform for the next generation of PLA small arms, being used as a test-bed for the then new 5.8×42mm DBP87 ammunition. The rifle has plastic furniture and an L-shaped folding stock. It never went into full-scale production but has been in service with PLA special forces. Design was finalized in 1987.
 Type 87-1: Prototype assault rifle used to develop and test 5.8×42mm DBP87 cartridge.
 Type 81 Tactical: Tactical variant used by the PAP with picatinny rails.
 CS/LR14: 7.62×51mm battle rifle. Newest tactical upgrade with modifications, such as tactical rails, foregrip, additional mountings, etc.
 NAR-10: Tactical variant made for export.
 NR-81S: semi-automatic made primarily for the European and Canadian markets.
 Type 81A: Upgraded variant with new stock and Picatinny rails shown at the 2018 Zhuhai Airshow.
 Type 81 SR: semi-automatic only sold in Canada to date, with heavy profile, long barrel, SVD-style stock, and lighter pull trigger.

Foreign variants

 BD-08 And BD-15: The BD-08 assault rifle, and BD-15 light machine gun have been made under licence by the Bangladesh Ordnance Factories since 2008.  BOF produce more than 10,000 BD-08 rifles per year. It has less recoil than the standard Type 81, and is the standard service rifle of the Bangladesh Army.

 Kachin Independence Army produced Type 81 variants dubbed the M23, comes with updated polymer furniture with a Sun Motif. Not much is known about their manufacturing details due to their clandestine origins. Reported to sometimes suffer from reliability problems.
 Kachin K09: Comes with black/plum polymer furniture.
 Kachin K010: Comes with green polymer furniture.
 Kachin K011: Dedicated indigenous 45mm rifle grenade launcher variant.
 Type 81s made by the United Wa State Army.

Users

: Made under license by the Bangladesh Ordnance Factories as BD-08 Assault Rifle and BD-15 LMG
: The Type 81 is still used by B-class units.

: Used by the Guinean Army and Navy
: Used by Iraqi Police.
 

 - Niger Armed Forces also use Type 81 machine guns.
: Produced under license by the Defence Industries Corporation of Nigeria

: Equipped with Type 81s since 2014.

Non-state actors

  Islamic State of Iraq and the Levant
  Kachin Independence Army
  Lord's Resistance Army
  Tamil Tigers
 United Wa State Army
  United Liberation Front of Assam: Misidentified at time as the AK 81.
  United National Liberation Front

References

External links
News report on BD-08 Assault Rifle

7.62×39mm assault rifles
Light machine guns
Short stroke piston firearms
Rifles of the Cold War
Infantry weapons of the Cold War
Cold War weapons of China
Weapons and ammunition introduced in 1983
Assault rifles of the People's Republic of China
Norinco